The rusty laughingthrush (Pterorhinus poecilorhynchus) is a species of bird in the family Leiothrichidae.
It is found in Taiwan. It formerly included the buffy laughingthrush of mainland China as a subspecies. Compared to the rusty laughingthrush, the buffy laughingthrush has paler grey underparts, more contrasting rufous wings, broader white tips to the tail, and distinct black lores.

This species was formerly placed in the genus Garrulax but following the publication of a comprehensive molecular phylogenetic study in 2018, it was moved to the resurrected genus Pterorhinus.

References

External links

 Rusty laughingthrush video on the Internet Bird Collection

rusty laughingthrush
Endemic birds of Taiwan
rusty laughingthrush
Taxonomy articles created by Polbot
Taxobox binomials not recognized by IUCN